The Wishaw and Coltness Railway was an early Scottish mineral railway. It ran for approximately 11 miles from Chapel Colliery, at Newmains in North Lanarkshire connecting to the Monkland and Kirkintilloch Railway near Whifflet, giving a means of transport for minerals around Newmains to market in Glasgow and Edinburgh.

Shortage of capital made construction slow, and the line was opened in stages from 1833, opening fully on 9 March 1844.

It had several branches serving pits and ironworks.

In 1849 it became part of the Caledonian Railway and sections of the original network form part of the modern West Coast Main Line railway.

Formation of the railway
In the early decades of the nineteenth century, the pace of industrialisation in central Scotland accelerated considerably, generating a huge demand for the raw materials of coal and iron ore. Transport of these heavy materials to market was a key issue. Canals offered some solution to this problem, but railways came to be seen as a more accessible option. The Monkland and Kirkintilloch Railway was opened in 1828, giving access to Monklands pits to Glasgow and Edinburgh via the Forth and Clyde Canal, vastly reducing the cost of carriage. Pits further afield saw the benefit to their competitors, and thought of constructing their own lines.

A Garturk and Garion Railway Bill was presented to Parliament in 1829 (though Awdry calls it the Garion and Garturk Railway).

During the parliamentary process the name was changed to the Wishaw and Coltness Railway, and under that name it was incorporated by an Act of Parliament on 1 June 1829. This authorised "making a railway from Chapel, in the parish of Cambusnethan, ...by Coltness and Gariongill, to join the Monkland and Kirkintilloch Railway ... in the parish of Old Monkland". Share capital was £80,000 with borrowing powers of £20,000. Tolls were laid down, and "the company may provide carriages for the conveyance of passengers, and charge for each person conveyed a rate of 4d per mile" and "locomotive engines may be used on the railway"

The newcomer built a Morningside terminus, facing east, in the north-east angle of Mill Road and Morningside Road, and built a short connection to the Wishaw and Coltness (W&CR) line on the west side of Morningside Road. The W&CR promptly built its own Morningside station at that point, abutting the road, and 2 chains (44 yards, 40 m) from the WM&CR station.

Operation
Like the other coal railways built in the same period, the railway thought of itself as analogous to a canal, where it provided a route and independent hauliers provided wagons and horses to pull them, and paid the company a toll for the privilege. In fact the original Act stipulated that "Owners of land may erect wharfs, warehouses and cranes on the line, and if they refuse the company may do so, charging for the use thereof [certain laid down charges]" 
 
By 1838 the G&GR was operating locomotives over the G&GR and the W&CR.

In 1839 the company decided to adopt locomotive traction, and to reduce the multiplicity of horse traders, in order to "do away with the collisions which are daily taking place between the drivers".

In 1842 the company bought 323 wagons from the independent hauliers on their line to reduce the number of traders on the line and to keep down the complaints from traders that locomotives were damaging their wagons.

The wagons were primitive and unsprung, and when the Caledonian Railway was later negotiating to purchase the line, it was essential to be able to report that "new wagons with springs and entire new engines have been put on".

In 1843–1845, 1,057,431 tons were carried by the company, of which 61.2% were conveyed by the company itself, and the balance by independent hauliers.

In this period, attention was being drawn to the high proportion of operating costs: of £11,125 annual average revenue in 1839–1843, 36.9% of that figure was expended in operation.

Locomotives
The Wishaw and Coltness company acquired three locomotives designed by Robert Dodds and built by James M Rowan of Glasgow: they were named Wishaw, Coltness and Cleland; they started work at the end of 1840. It was reported that

When received, they were forthwith applied to the purpose of the traffic, and they have provided the advantages to be derived on this as on the adjoining railways from the more general employment of engines instead of horse haulage. In all cases they have been found to be of great service to the prosperity of the Company's revenue.

Passengers
The Company started a passenger service to Coatbridge on 8 May 1845 leaving Morningside at 7.07 a.m., and calling at Stirling Road, Overtown Road, Wishaw, Motherwell, Holytown and Carnbroe Iron Works, arriving at Coatbridge at 8.50 a.m. A through coach was taken on by the Glasgow, Garnkirk and Coatbridge Railway (GG&CR) to its Townhead terminal in Glasgow, and there was a corresponding late afternoon return service. Through tickets were issued from Lanark, by omnibus to Stirling Road to connect, and the GG&CR later developed tourism by this route, advertising the scenic beauty of the Falls of Clyde at Lanark, using a morning outward service and afternoon return.

Names of the early passenger stations bear little resemblance to modern naming. From the junction at Whifflet, they were:

Cleland line:
 Carnbroe (or Carnbroe Iron Works), opened 1843, closed about 1846
 Holytown (located at the later Mossend North Junction); opened 1844, renamed Mossend 1882, closed 1962
 Carfin, opened in about 1834, renamed Holytown in 1882, still in operation
 Newarthill (located at the present-day Carfin station); opened in 1834, closed in 1880

Coltness line:
 Motherwell (located a short distance south of the present station); opened 1845, closed in 1885 when the present station opened
 Flemington, opened in 1891, closed in 1965
 Shieldmuir, opened 1990
 Wishaw, opened in 1845; renamed Wishaw South in 1880 when the new line from Holytown Junction to Law Junction opened; closed in 1958
 Overtown, opened in 1845; closed in 1881
 Carluke (located a considerable distance from the present Carluke station); opened 1845, renamed Stirling Road, Morningside in 1848; closed in 1853
 Morningside, opened in 1845, closed in 1930

The Morningside line became a minor branch off the West Coast Main Line when the Caledonian Railway took over the Company, and the passenger service probably ceased in 1853.

When the Caledonian Railway built a new line via Newmains, it approached Morningside from the north and a passenger service from Holytown terminated there. In 1895 and in 1922 there were five trains each way with one extra on Saturdays. The Wilsontown, Morningside and Coltness Railway operated a service from its own Morningside station, 40 m away by rail, heading east to Bathgate. There was not much co-ordination of train times, and the 40 m of railway between the two stations did not have a passenger service.

Wider horizons
The line was built as a coal railway, with the primary object of conveying the mineral to market in central Scotland. The industrial processes developed rapidly during the first decade of the line's existence, so did the demand for efficient transport. As the Coltness Iron Works and other industries developed, they needed to bring in materials from further afield, and to dispatch their products to far-off destinations.

In common with the other "coal railways" the technical limitations of the little railway became more obvious, and the most important of these was the track gauge of 4 ft 6 in, which required transshipment of loads at the point of connection with standard gauge lines. In 1847, the railway changed its gauge to the standard 4 ft 8½ in.

The Caledonian Railway was being promoted about the same time, with the object of participating in forming a main line route between Central Scotland and Carlisle, connecting there with the English railway trunk network. At the time the Grand Junction Railway was planning an approach from the south to Carlisle.

The Caledonian Railway promoters planned an entry through Annandale. To get access to Glasgow, the Caledonian secured agreement from the Wishaw and Coltness Railway and the Glasgow Garnkirk and Coatbridge Railway to use their lines for the approach to the city. The Caledonian took a lease of the Wishaw and Coltness from 1 January 1847, guaranteeing 10.5% on the W&C capitalisation of £240,000. (Agreement to lease the GG&CR had been obtained a year earlier at 8%.)

For the time being the Caledonian used the GG&CR Townhead terminus in Glasgow, but soon extended to a new terminal at Glasgow, Buchanan Street.

Parts of the Wishaw and Coltness routes remain in use at the present day: the section from the original Motherwell station, just south-east of the present-day station, to Garriongill Junction, and the section from Whifflet to Mossend South Junction follows the original construction.

References

Sources

Notes

Caledonian Railway
Closed railway lines in Scotland
Horse-drawn railways
Mining railways
Early Scottish railway companies
Pre-grouping British railway companies
4 ft 6 in gauge railways in Scotland
Railway companies established in 1829
Railway lines opened in 1844
Railway companies disestablished in 1849
1829 establishments in Scotland
British companies established in 1829
Transport in North Lanarkshire
British companies disestablished in 1849